Jonathan Belcher (July 23, 1710 – March 30, 1776) was a British-American lawyer, chief justice, and Colonial Governor of Nova Scotia.

Biography
Born in Boston, Massachusetts, the second son of Jonathan Belcher and Mary Partridge, Belcher entered Harvard College, where in 1728 he received a Bachelor of Arts degree. In 1731 he proceeded to Master of Arts, also at Harvard. In 1730, he entered the Middle Temple, London, to read law, and in 1734 was called to the English bar. In the meantime he had been admitted as a fellow-commoner to Trinity College, Cambridge, where in 1733 he received another master's degree in mathematics. He later received a third master's degree from the College of New Jersey (now Princeton University).

In 1754, Belcher was sent to Nova Scotia to become the first Chief Justice of the Nova Scotia Supreme Court. Prior to Belcher's arrival Nova Scotia had no formally trained law officers. He also served on the Nova Scotia Council. On July 28, 1755, he published a document which concluded that deportation of the Acadians was both authorized and required under the law. From 1761 to 1763, he was also Lieutenant Governor of Nova Scotia. He negotiated the peace that led to the Burying the Hatchet ceremony in Nova Scotia.

Belcher was a member of the American Philosophical Society, elected in 1768.

He died in office in 1776. He is buried in the Old Burying Ground in Halifax.

Legacy 
Belcher gave his name to Fort Belcher (1761–67), after which Fort Belcher Road, Lower Onslow, Nova Scotia is named. The fort was built at the same time as Fort Ellis.

Belcher married in King's Chapel, Boston, on 8 April 1756 to Abigail Allen. A salver (silver platter) given to them on their wedding day is now in the Metropolitan Museum of Art. They had five sons and two daughters.

Gallery

Sources 
 Nova Scotia Historical Society. 1914, p. 25

References

1710 births
1776 deaths
British emigrants to pre-Confederation Nova Scotia
Governors of the Colony of Nova Scotia
Converts to Anglicanism
Harvard College alumni
Princeton University alumni
People from colonial Boston
Alumni of Trinity College, Cambridge
People of colonial Massachusetts
Colony of Nova Scotia judges